Fauna of Sweden may refer to:
 List of amphibians and reptiles of Sweden
 List of birds of Sweden
 List of mammals of Sweden

See also
 Outline of Sweden

References

Fauna of Sweden